Steel Lake is a very long, narrow lake in northwestern Ontario, Canada.  It is located in Thunder Bay District, east of Nipigon and Red Rock, and west of Manitouwadge. It is part of the Steel River system, situated just downstream and north of the equally long and narrow Cairngorm Lake. The lake's outlet is in the extreme north end, at which point the Steel River turns 180 degrees and flow due south.

See also
List of lakes in Ontario

References

Lakes of Thunder Bay District